Allison is the debut studio album by Mexican rock band Allison, released on June 26, 2006 by Sony BMG.

Originally said album was planned to be produced by Soundgüich, a Mexican independent label and would be distributed by Sony BMG, however, this second label decided to produce the disc on its own.

Background
The album was produced by Armando Avila, the album was positioned at number 1 on the Mexican charts. The album was one of the best sellers in Mexico in 2006, selling 50,000 copies in just one month, obtaining the gold record certification by AMPROFON. By the end of 2006, the album had gone platinum in Mexico for more than 100,000 copies sold.

Track listing

Personnel
All credits adapted for AllMusic

Allison
 Erik Canales - lead vocals, rhythm guitar
 Abraham Isael Jarquín "Fear" - lead guitar
 Manuel Ávila "Manolín" - bass, backing vocals
 Diego Stommel - drums (in special edition)
Additional Musicians
 Roy Cañedo - drums
 Güido Laris - backing vocals, vocal director
Production
 Armando Ávila - production, arranger, bajo sexto, backing vocals, directed, engineer, guitar, acoustic guitar, keyboards, mixed, realization
 Emilio Ávila - executive coordinator
 Michkin Boyzo - production coordination
 Guillermo Gutiérrez Leyva - A&R, direction
 Juan Carlos Moguel - engineer
 Jorge Rodriguez - assistant engineer
 Ignacio Segura - assistant engineer
 Don Tyler - mastering
 Arturo Zuñiga - artist direction, photography

DVD
 Frágil (music video)
 Aquí (music video)
 Me Cambio (music video)
 Ya No Te Amo (live video)
 80's (music video)
 La Historia (documental)

Charts

Weekly charts

Year-End charts

Certifications

See also
List of best-selling albums in Mexico

References

2006 debut albums
Allison (band) albums